Johnny Yune (born Yoon Jong-seung, October 22, 1936 – March 8, 2020) was a Korean-American actor, singer and comedian. He played the lead in the 1980s films They Call Me Bruce? and They Still Call Me Bruce.

Early life
Johnny Yune was born Yune Jong-seung in 1936 in Eumseong County, Chungcheongbuk-do Province, South Korea (then under Japanese rule).  He graduated from Sungdong High School in Sindang-dong, Jung-gu, Seoul, and came to Massachusetts, U.S. on an ROK Navy scholarship in 1962. He studied vocal music at Ohio Wesleyan University. He became a U.S. citizen in 1978, at which point he anglicized his first name to "John", due to its phonetic similarity.

Career 
In 1964, Yune practiced his stand-up routine in places such as the Cafe Tel Aviv at 250 West 72nd Street, New York City. In 1977, he was discovered at a Santa Monica comedy club by comedian Johnny Carson and was invited to appear on his talk show, The Tonight Show Starring Johnny Carson. His first appearance on the show, in February 1979, became his big break because actor Charlton Heston, who was supposed to be the main guest for the night, did not arrive on time. As a result, Yune was given over 20 minutes on the show, during which he performed a stand-up set, spoke with Carson and sang "'O sole mio". Carson liked Yune and had him on the show 34 times in the 1970s and '80s, making Yune one of the show's most frequent guests for a stand-up comedian.

Yune also appeared in his own special on NBC.

He played a Mongolian named "Jon Yune" in the 1979 movie Meteor, and performed as a stand-up comedian in the 1980s. 

Yune performed at the 1988 Summer Olympics at Seoul, along with Bob Hope and Brooke Shields. 

From 1989 to 1990, he hosted The Johnny Yune Show (자니윤쇼), the first Americanized talk show in Korea. Singer Jo Young-nam was a co-MC. The show was a hit, but only after a year, Yune decided to leave KBS due to limited freedom of the media.

Politics 
Yune was an alternate delegate at the 1988 Republican National Convention, where he sang the U.S. national anthem on August 16, 1988.

He was appointed auditor of the Korea Tourism Organization in 2014 by the Park Geun-hye administration. His appointment provoked controversy, as his critics questioned his lack of business experience and close ties to the then-president. He held the job for two years.

Personal life 
Johnny Yune married a Korean American named Julia Yune in 1999; they divorced in 2010. He regained his Korean citizenship in 2013.

Yune was diagnosed with dementia in 2017. He died in Southern California on March 8, 2020, at the age of 83; per his wishes his body was donated to medical science.

Filmography

References

Further reading 
 Profile in Little White Lies

External links

1936 births
2020 deaths
South Korean emigrants to the United States
American male comedians
20th-century American male actors
20th-century American comedians
21st-century American male actors
21st-century American comedians
American male film actors
American male television actors
American male actors of Korean descent